Fimbria soverbii is a species of marine clams in the family Lucinidae.

References

External links 
 

Lucinidae
Bivalves described in 1842